Shek Kip Mei Sports Association was a Hong Kong football club which played in the Hong Kong First Division League. It is better known as Workable FC and Tuen Mun Progoal FC, which are under the football division of the Hong Kong Football Association from 2007 to 2009.

History
The team got the 1st Runner-up in Hong Kong Third A Division League in 2005–06 season and qualified into Third Division League Final Round to fight for 2 promotion positions among 4 teams. Shek Kip Mei topped the table and was promoted to Second Division.

Workable (2007–2008)

After the promotion, the team added a few former Hong Kong national football team players to strengthen the team for further promotion to the First Division. The team finished second in the Second Division in the 2006–07 season and has been promoted to the First Division in 2007–08.

After the promotion, the team obtained an HK$4,000,000 naming sponsorship from Workable Corporation and was named as Workable Football Club to compete in First Division League. The team released all the promotion heroes in Shek Kip Mei and obtained a few players from the extinct Hong Kong 08 as the stem of team construction.

They played its debut match in First Division on 8 September 2007, drawing 2–2 with Tai Po in Mong Kok Stadium. The match was also highlighted by that Workable manager Chan Hiu Ming was the head coach of Tai Po in the previous season.

The club dissolved after the end of the 2007–08 season, which they finished 9th out of 10 teams in First Division.

Tuen Mun Progoal (2008–2009)

The team was renamed as Tuen Mun Progoal for the 2008–09 Hong Kong First Division League season, after lending its entry to Progoal Limited. However, in November 2009, Shek Kip Mei was disqualified because Tuen Mun Progoal defaulted labour insurance.

Honours
Second Division
Runners-up (1): 2006–07
Third Division Final
Winners (1): 2005–06
Third Division "A"
Runners-up (1): 2005–06

Sponsors
{| class="wikitable" style="text-align: center"
|-
!Period
!Kit Manufacturer
!Kit Sponsor
|-
|2007–2008
|Adidas
|Crocodile Garments
|}

Recent seasons
{|class="wikitable"
|-bgcolor="#efefef"
! Season
!
! Pos.
! Pl.
! W
! D
! L
! GS
! GA
! P
!Senior Shield
!League Cup
!FA Cup
!colspan=2|Asia
!Notes
|-
||2006–07
|D2
|align=right bgcolor=silver|2
|align=right|20||align=right|14||align=right|4||align=right|2
|align=right|68||align=right|18||align=right|46
||
|||||||||promoted
|-
|2007–08
|D1
|align=right|9
|align=right|18||align=right|3||align=right|6||align=right|9
|align=right|14||align=right|34||align=right|15
||first round
||group stage
||first round
|||||Team name had changed to Workable Football Club for 1 season.
|}

References

External links
 wkfc.com.hk Official website
Shek Kip Mei SA at HKFA.com
 Workable fan's blog

Football clubs in Hong Kong
Defunct football clubs in Hong Kong
Association football clubs established in 2007
Association football clubs disestablished in 2009